Mark Vincent Didio (born February 17, 1969) is a former American football wide receiver who played one season with the Pittsburgh Steelers of the National Football League. He played college football at the University of Connecticut and attended Henninger High School in Syracuse, New York. He was waived by the Steelers on August 23, 1993.

References

External links
Just Sports Stats
Fanbase profile

Living people
1969 births
Players of American football from Syracuse, New York
American football wide receivers
UConn Huskies football players
Pittsburgh Steelers players